The SZD-7 Osa  was a single-seat developmental glider aircraft that was designed and built in Poland at Szybowcowy Zakład Doświadczalny (Glider Experimental Works) in Bielsko-Biała in 1950. Only one example was built.

Development
The SZD-7 or IS-7 Osa (Wasp) was based on the IS-2 Mucha, with a laminar flow aerofoil section developed by Tadeusz Kostia. Little information on laminar flow aerofoils was available but Kostia was able to design the aerofoil for the SZD-7 Osa to achieve laminar flow to at least 18% chord. As well as the laminar flow wings, the Osa introduced the SZD plate-style airbrakes, which were installed aft of the mainspar. The first flight of the Osa took place at Bielsko airfield piloted by Adam Zientek on 16 August 1950. The prototype was registered as SP-1047.

Specifications (SZD-7 Osa)

See also

References

Taylor, J. H. (ed) (1989) Jane's Encyclopedia of Aviation. Studio Editions: London. p. 29

External links

 SZD-7 (IS-7) Osa on piotrp.de

SZD-07
SZD aircraft
Aircraft first flown in 1950